Dwight Anthony Anderson (December 28, 1960 – September 5, 2020) was an American professional basketball player.

College career
Born in Dayton, Ohio, Anderson graduated from Roth High School in Dayton. He played for the University of Kentucky  1978–1980, scoring 13 PPG on 50FG%. From 1981–1982 he played for University of Southern California scoring 20 PPG on 40FG%.

Professional career
Anderson was selected by the Washington Bullets in the 2nd round of the 1982 NBA draft. He played one season for Denver Nuggets during 1982–83.  Anderson also spent several seasons in the Continental Basketball Association with the Ohio Mixers, Albuquerque Silvers, Cincinnati Slammers and Evansville Thunder.  In 112 CBA games, Anderson averaged 21.0 points per game.

References

External links
NBA stats @ BasketballReference.com
Dwight Anderson page

1960 births
2020 deaths
Albuquerque Silvers players
American expatriate basketball people in the Philippines
American men's basketball players
Basketball players from Dayton, Ohio
Cincinnati Slammers players
Denver Nuggets players
Evansville Thunder players
Kentucky Wildcats men's basketball players
McDonald's High School All-Americans
Ohio Mixers players
Parade High School All-Americans (boys' basketball)
Philippine Basketball Association imports
Point guards
USC Trojans men's basketball players
Washington Bullets draft picks
Shell Turbo Chargers players